Jolette is a feminine given name. It may refer to:

Jolette Hernández (born 1984) Mexican singer and television presenter
Jolette Law, assistant coach for the South Carolina Lady Gamecocks